Rick Fox  is the former head coach of Drake Bulldogs football team. He was named the head coach in December 2013, and coached his first game in 2014. He resigned from Drake on December 10, 2018.

Head coaching record

References

External links
 Drake profile 

Place of birth missing (living people)
Year of birth missing (living people)
Living people
Sportspeople from Wheaton, Illinois
Players of American football from Illinois
Wheaton Thunder football players
Coaches of American football from Illinois
Wheaton Thunder football coaches
Aurora Spartans football coaches
Centre Colonels football coaches
Drake Bulldogs football coaches
Taylor Trojans football coaches